Joseph Francis "Sonny" Burke (March 22, 1914 – May 31, 1980) was an American musical arranger, composer, Big Band leader and producer. In 1937, he graduated from Duke University, where he had formed and led the jazz big band known as the Duke Ambassadors.

Background
During the 1930s and 1940s, Burke was a big band arranger in New York City, worked with Sam Donahue's band, and during the 1940s and 1950s worked as an arranger for the Charlie Spivak and Jimmy Dorsey bands, among others.  In 1955, he wrote, along with Peggy Lee, the songs to Disney's Lady and the Tramp. He also wrote songs with John Elliot for Disney's Toot, Whistle, Plunk and Boom, which won the 1953 Oscar for Best Short Subject (Cartoons).
 
He wrote the music for number of popular songs, including "Black Coffee" and "Midnight Sun", co-written with jazz vibraphonist Lionel Hampton. The song's lyrics were added later by Johnny Mercer. Burke was an active arranger, conductor and A&R man at major Hollywood record labels, especially Decca Records where he worked with Charles "Bud" Dant. He also wrote and arranged the theme for the early 1960s show Hennesey, a jazzy update of The Sailor's Hornpipe.

Later Burke became musical director of Warner Bros. Records / Reprise Records and was responsible for many of Frank Sinatra's albums, and was producer of Sinatra's recording of "My Way" and Petula Clark's "This Is My Song" written by Charles Chaplin for his movie, A Countess From Hong Kong. He was also the bandleader for recordings of leading singers such as Dinah Shore, Bing Crosby, The Andrews Sisters, The Mills Brothers, Ella Fitzgerald, Mel Tormé and Billy Eckstine.

Death and interment
Burke died from cancer on May 31, 1980, in Santa Monica, California, aged 66. He was survived by his wife Dorothy Gillis Burke and his four children, Gaylord, Peter and twins Jerry and Tom Burke. He had one sister, Rhoda Burke Andrews, mother of Punch Andrews, Bob Seger's longtime manager. His interment was at Holy Cross Cemetery, Culver City.

Discography

As leader
Sonny Burke plays Mambos (1951)
Sonny Burke and his Orchestra I & II (1951)
The Sonny Burke-Don Elliott Six (ca. 1960)

As sideman
With Brass Fever
Brass Fever (Impulse!, 1975)
Time Is Running Out (Impulse!, 1976)
With Dizzy Gillespie
Free Ride (Pablo, 1977) – composed and arranged by Lalo Schifrin
With John Handy
Carnival (ABC/Impulse, 1977)
With Blue Mitchell
African Violet (Impulse!, 1977)

As arranger
With Ben Sidran
Don't Let Go (Blue Thumb, 1974)

References

External links
 Guide to the Sonny Burke Papers Rubenstein Rare Book and Manuscript Library, Duke University
 Jazz Archive at Duke University 

1914 births
1980 deaths
20th-century American composers
20th-century American male musicians
20th-century jazz composers
American jazz bandleaders
American jazz composers
American male jazz composers
American music arrangers
Brass Fever members
Burials at Holy Cross Cemetery, Culver City
Duke University alumni
Grammy Award winners
Jazz musicians from Pennsylvania
Musicians from Scranton, Pennsylvania
Record producers from Pennsylvania
Deaths from cancer in California